Spence Broughton (c. 1746 – 14 April 1792) was an English highwayman who was executed for robbing the Sheffield and Rotherham mail. After his execution he gained notoriety because his body was gibbeted at the scene of the crime on Attercliffe Common between Sheffield and Rotherham, where it hung for 36 years.

Biography
Little is known of Broughton's early life. He is thought to have been born near Sleaford in Lincolnshire. The son of a farmer, he took up farming too, married and had three children. He developed a gambling habit and left his wife for the cockfighting scenes of Sheffield, Grantham and Derby.

The crime
The robbery took place on 29 January or 9 February 1791 (sources differ) at Ickles, on the Rotherham edge of Attercliffe Common. Broughton and his accomplice John Oxley stayed in Sheffield the night before the robbery and then walked out of the town on the Rotherham road where they met the mail coming towards Sheffield. However, they intended to rob it on its way back to Rotherham so they lay in wait for it to arrive. George Leasley, the boy driving the mail cart, described how he was led into a field, blindfolded with a handkerchief, and his hands tied behind his back and fixed to a hedge. After about an hour he freed himself and found his horse, but the Rotherham post bag was gone. Broughton and Oxley escaped towards Mansfield. On their way they went through the contents of the post bag and found that the only item of value was a French bill of exchange worth £123; they disposed of the rest of the contents in a brook and parted, with Oxley proceeding to London to cash the bill.

Capture and trial
Broughton and Oxley were arrested, along with John Shaw, in London in October 1791 following further robberies at Cambridge and Aylesbury. Broughton was sent to Newgate Prison, and Oxley to Clerkenwell Prison. Though it has since been alleged that Shaw was the instigator of the crimes, at trial Shaw gave evidence that Broughton was the ring-leader—Oxley alleged that he did this because he and Broughton shared an interest in the same woman. Oxley himself escaped from Clerkenwell on 31 October, leaving Broughton to stand trial alone.

The trial took place in York on 24 March 1792. Shaw testified that Broughton and Oxley had come to him after robbing the Rotherham mail to ask him where they could cash the £123 bill. Next to testify was John Close, who said that he had met Broughton in London looking for Oxley, and Broughton had complained to him that Oxley had not given him his share of the proceeds from the robbery. John Townsend, the arresting officer, described the events on the day of the arrest, after which the jury found Broughton guilty and the judge, Mr. Justice Buller, sentenced him to death by hanging "and afterwards to be hung in chains on the Common, within three miles of Sheffield, where the robbery was committed." The trial took only 90 minutes.

Spence Broughton was executed at Knavesmire, York on 14 April 1792. In the days before his execution Broughton is purported to have shown great remorse, writing:
Surely I have greatly transgressed the laws both of God and man! In what manner shall a sinful wretch, like me, presume to approach the throne of mercy? Alas! my repeated provocations do now wound me to the very soul.
At his execution he is reported to have professed his innocence, "saying that he was a murdered man; that, though he came down with the intent to rob the mail, he was six miles from the place at the time of the robbery", though he admitted receiving part of the proceeds.

Gibbeting and folklore

On 16 April Broughton's body was taken to Attercliffe Common to be hung in a gibbet. George Drabble, the keeper of a pub called the Arrow that was located near the site, reported that crowds started to gather on the common the day before. The gibbet is reported to have attracted 40,000 visitors to the Common on the first day alone. Broughton's body remained hanging in the gibbet on Attercliffe Common for nearly 36 years. It was finally removed in 1827 when Henry Sorby, who had bought the land it stood on, had it cut down because he had grown tired of trespassers on his land. The remains of the gibbet post were claimed to have been rediscovered in 1867 when a solid oak post was found embedded in a framework in the ground during excavations for the cellars of some new houses in Clifton Street, Attercliffe Common. The discovery once again drew large crowds to Attercliffe Common.

The length of time that the rotting body of Spence Broughton hung on Attercliffe Common and the great interest that it attracted led to Broughton becoming a hero of local folklore. One story was that a group of drunken potters from the Don Pottery, passing the site of the gibbet, threw stones at the skeleton and managed to dislodge two fingers. Taking these as trophies they were calcined and incorporated into the body of a jug. Songs were also written about Broughton including Spence Broughton reported by C. J. Davison Ingledew and Spence Broughton's Lament by Joseph Mather:
Hark, his blood, in strains so piercing,
Cries for justice night and day;
In these words which I'm rehersing,
Now methinks I hear him say—
"Thou, who art my spirit's portion
In the realms of endless bliss,
When at first thou gav'st me motion
Knew that I should come to this.

The fate of John Oxley became the subject of speculation, with reports that he was smuggled out of Folkestone to America. However, the Sheffield newspapers reported in January 1793 that Oxley had been discovered dead of hunger and cold in a barn on Loxley Moor near Sheffield.

References and notes

1746 births
1792 deaths
People executed by the Kingdom of Great Britain
Executed people from Lincolnshire
History of Sheffield
People executed by England and Wales by hanging
People executed for robbery
People from Sleaford, Lincolnshire
English highwaymen